Siegling is a surname. Notable people with the surname include:

 Alfred Siegling (1918–1984), German soldier awarded the Knight's Cross of the Iron Cross
 Karl Siegling, Australian businessman
 Marie Siegling (1824–1920), American composer
 Rudolph Septimus Siegling (1839–1894), American legislator and lawyer
 Wilhelm Siegling (1880-1940), German linguist

German-language surnames